Botnfjellet Mountain is a mountain,  high, forming the northeast and east walls of Livdebotnen Cirque in the Humboldt Mountains of Queen Maud Land. It was discovered and photographed by the Third German Antarctic Expedition, 1937–39. It was mapped by Norway from air photos and surveys by the Sixth Norwegian Antarctic Expedition, 1956–60, and named "Botnfjellet" (the cirque mountain).

References
 

Humboldt Mountains (Antarctica)
Mountains of Queen Maud Land